The 1983 Giro d'Italia was the 66th edition of the Giro d'Italia, one of cycling's Grand Tours. The field consisted of 162 riders, and 140 riders finished the race.

By rider

By nationality

References

1983 Giro d'Italia
1983